The Mongolian Football Federation (MFF, Mongolyn Khölbömbögiin Kholboo) is the governing body of football in Mongolia. It was founded in 1959, and gained both FIFA and AFC affiliation in 1998. Its top league is the National Premier League.

Association staff

See also
Mongolia national football team
Mongolian Premier League

References

External links
 Football Federation of Mongolia 
 Mongolia at the FIFA website.
 Mongolia at AFC site
 Mongolia at the EAFF website.
Mongolian Football Central

Football in Mongolia
1959 establishments in Mongolia
Mongolia
Football
Sports organizations established in 1959